Gene Ellis "Mickey" Klutts (born September 20, 1954) is an American former professional baseball third baseman, who played in Major League Baseball (MLB) from 1976 to 1983 with the New York Yankees, Oakland Athletics, and Toronto Blue Jays. An infielder, Klutts was a favorite of manager Billy Martin, for whom he played in both New York and Oakland. He batted .319 with 24 home runs and 80 runs batted in (RBI) with the Syracuse Chiefs and shared International League Most Valuable Player (MVP) honors with Rich Dauer and Joe Lis in 1976.

Klutts attended El Rancho High School in Pico Rivera, California.

References

External links

1954 births
Living people
American expatriate baseball players in Canada
Baseball players from California
Fort Lauderdale Yankees players
International League MVP award winners
Johnson City Yankees players
Major League Baseball third basemen
New York Yankees players
Oakland Athletics players
Oneonta Yankees players
People from Pico Rivera, California
Toronto Blue Jays players
Sportspeople from Montebello, California
Syracuse Chiefs players
Tacoma Tigers players
Vancouver Canadians players
West Haven Yankees players